The Nihonkai evergreen forests ecoregion (WWF ID: PA0427) covers a thin strip of land on the western coast (facing the Sea of Japan) of the island of Honshu in Japan. It is bounded on the east by the Nihonkai montane deciduous forests ecoregion.

Location and description 
The coastal strips extends the most of the length of the island, encompassing bays, inlets, rocky coasts and caves.  Also represented in the ecoregion are the Oki Islands and Sado Island in the Sea of Japan about 40 km west of Honshu.

Climate 
The climate of the ecoregion is Humid continental climate, warm wet summer (Köppen climate classification (Cfa)). This climate is characterized by large seasonal temperature differentials. Precipitation is relatively even throughout the year.

Flora and fauna 
About 37% of the ecoregion is closed evergreen needle-leaf forest, 27% is closed deciduous forest, 11% cultivated, 10% urban/built-up, and the rest is other types of terrain.

Protected areas 
 Sanin Kaigan National Park
 Daisen-Oki National Park

References 

Palearctic ecoregions
Ecoregions of Japan
Temperate broadleaf and mixed forests